Sir Edward Codrington,  (27 April 1770 – 28 April 1851) was a British admiral, who took part in the Battle of Trafalgar and the Battle of Navarino.

Early life and career
The youngest of three brothers born to Edward Codrington the elder (1732–1775) and Rebecca Lestourgeon (Sturgeon) (1736–1770), Codrington came from a long military tradition. Edward the elder was the youngest son of William Codrington, 1st Baronet. Their aristocratic, landowning family, was descended from John Codrington, reputed to be standard-bearer to Henry V at Agincourt, and related to the Codrington baronets, Codrington was educated by an uncle named Mr Bethell. He was sent for a short time to Harrow, and entered the Royal Navy in July 1783. He served off the Eastern Seaboard of the United States, in the Mediterranean and in home waters, until he was promoted to lieutenant on 28 May 1793, when Lord Howe selected him to be signal lieutenant on the flagship of the Channel fleet at the beginning of the French Revolutionary Wars. In that capacity he served on the 100-gun  during the operations which culminated in the battle of the Glorious First of June.

As a reward for his actions at the battle, on 7 October 1794 he was promoted to commander, and on 6 April 1795 attained the rank of Post-Captain and the command of the 22-gun  from which he observed the Battle of Groix on 23 June 1795. His next command, from July 1796 to March 1797, was the frigate  whom he commanded in the Channel and off the coast of Portugal.

Following this, Codrington spent a period largely on land and on half-pay for some years. In December 1802 he married Jane Hall, an English woman from Kingston, Jamaica (with whom he had 3 sons and 3 daughters), and remained without a ship until the Peace of Amiens came to a close in 1803.

In 1797, Edward Codrington, his brother William John and sister Caroline jointly inherited their uncle Christopher Bethell's residuary estates, including a slave plantation in Antigua.

Service in the Napoleonic Wars and the War of 1812
On the renewal of hostilities with France he remained in frigates for some time before being given the ship of the line  in the spring of 1805 which was attached to Admiral Nelson's fleet off Cadiz in the blockade of the combined fleet. Codrington and Orion were engaged at the Battle of Trafalgar on 21 October 1805, where Orion was stationed to the rear of the northern division and therefore took two hours to reach battle. Orion, with other ships, dismasted and then sailed round her, firing continually until she surrendered.

For the next several years, Codrington fought alongside the Spanish against the French in the Mediterranean Sea, commanding a squadron that harried French shipping and made numerous coastal raids. During this time also participated in the disastrous Walcheren expedition in 1809.

The two months of May and June in 1811 were to prove his most testing time while stationed on Spain's eastern seaboard. He went to great lengths to help the Spanish besieged at Tarragona by the French Army of Aragon under Louis Gabriel Suchet. Convinced that the Marquis de Campo Verde, the Spanish general in charge of Tarragona, was not up to the task, Codrington, who had a clearer understanding of the situation, helped the British military agent Charles William Doyle to contrive a plan of succour. Through his own personal efforts Codrington brought to Tarragona 6,300 Spanish infantry and 291 artillerymen as reinforcements. He spent many nights in the port area guiding cannon launches against the enemy. When the city fell, he rescued over 600 people from the beach in a Dunkirk-style operation under fire from enemy cannon and personally undertook to reunite mothers and babies who had been separated during the evacuation. Afterwards, he intervened on a political level to stop Captain General de Lacy disarming the local Catalan Somaténs (militias).

Codrington was promoted to the rank of rear admiral (of the Blue) on 4 June 1814, while he was serving off the coast of North America as captain of the fleet to Vice Admiral Sir Alexander Cochrane during the operations against Washington, Baltimore and New Orleans during the War of 1812. In recognition of this service, he was made a Knight Commander of the Order of the Bath in 1815. He became a rear admiral of the Red on 12 August 1819, and then a vice admiral on 10 July 1821. He was also elected a Fellow of the Royal Society in February 1822.

Greek War of Independence and the Battle of Navarino

In December 1826 Codrington was appointed Commander-in-Chief, Mediterranean Fleet and sailed on 1 February 1827. From that date until his recall on 21 June 1828 he was engaged in the arduous duties imposed on him by the Greek War of Independence, which had led to anarchy in occupied Greece and surrounding areas. His orders were to enforce a peaceful solution on the situation in Greece, but Codrington was not known for his diplomacy, and on 20 October 1827 he destroyed the Turkish and Egyptian fleet at the Battle of Navarino while in command of a combined British, French and Russian fleet.

After the battle Codrington went to Malta to refit his ships. He remained there till May 1828, when he sailed to join his French and Russian colleagues on the coast of the Morea. They endeavoured to enforce the evacuation of the peninsula by Ibrahim Pasha peacefully. The Pasha made diplomatic difficulties, which came in the form of continuous genocide against the Greeks of Morea who were to be replaced with Muslims from Africa, and on 25 July the three admirals agreed that Codrington should go to Alexandria to obtain Ibrahim's recall by his father Mehemet Ali. Codrington had heard on 22 June of his own supersession, but, as his successor had not arrived, he carried out the arrangement made on 25 July, and his presence at Alexandria led to the treaty of the 6 August 1828, by which the evacuation of the Morea was settled. His services were recognised by the grant of the Grand Cross of the Bath, but there is no doubt that the British government was embarrassed by his heavy-handed gunboat diplomacy and not too impressed by the further weakening of Russia's main opponent, the Ottomans.

Later years

After his return home, Codrington spent some time in defending himself, and then in leisure abroad. He commanded a training squadron in the Channel in 1831 and became a full admiral on 10 January 1837. He was elected Member of Parliament for Devonport in 1832, and sat for that constituency until he accepted the Chiltern Hundreds in 1839. From November 1839 to December 1842 he was Commander-in-Chief, Portsmouth.

On 5 October 1835, under the terms of the Slavery Abolition Act of 1833, Codrington was awarded government compensation of £2588 6s 6d for the 190 slaves he had owned at the Rooms plantation on Antigua, and who had been freed under the terms of the act.

Codrington died in London on 28 April 1851. He left two sons, both of whom achieved distinction in the British armed forces. Sir William Codrington (1804–1884) was a commander in the Crimean War. Sir Henry Codrington (1808–1877), a naval officer, became an Admiral of the Fleet.

A third son, Edward Codrington, was a midshipman aboard  when he died sometime in 1821 or 1822 in the Mediterranean. He had been taking a cutter to Hydra when a squall overturned the boat, drowning him, a merchant, and three crewmen.

Codrington was buried in St Peter's Church, Eaton Square, but in 1954 the remains were reburied at Brookwood Cemetery in Surrey, plot number 70. Plaques to his memory can be found in St Paul's Cathedral and All Saints Church, Dodington, close to the family home, and there is a large obelisk dedicated to the memory of him and the other officers at Navarino at Pylos in Greece.

Numerous roads are named after him in Greece and stamps with his figure have been issued. At least three pubs; one in south-west London and two now-closed pubs in Coventry and south-east London are named after him.

In June 2020, a plaque in Brighton commemorating Codrington was removed following protest over the commemoration of a slave owner as part of the George Floyd protests.

Notes

References

 

Attribution:

Further reading
The Trafalgar Captains (2005) – Colin White and the 1805 Club, Chatham Publishing, London

External links

 
 Animation of the Battle of Trafalgar
 Edward Codrington bio
 The Battle of Navarino

|-

|-

1770 births
1851 deaths
Military personnel from Gloucestershire
People educated at Harrow School
People from South Gloucestershire District
Royal Navy admirals
Royal Navy personnel of the French Revolutionary Wars
Royal Navy personnel of the Napoleonic Wars
Royal Navy personnel of the War of 1812
British military personnel of the Greek War of Independence
Royal Navy captains at the Battle of Trafalgar
Members of the Parliament of the United Kingdom for English constituencies
Knights Grand Cross of the Order of the Bath
UK MPs 1832–1835
UK MPs 1835–1837
UK MPs 1837–1841
Recipients of the Order of St. George of the Second Degree
Fellows of the Royal Society
Burials at Brookwood Cemetery
British slave owners
Codrington family